The 1985–86 Football League season was Birmingham City Football Club's 83rd in the Football League and their 50th in the First Division, to which they were promoted in 1984–85. They finished in 21st position in the 22-team division, so were relegated back to the Second Division after only one season. They entered the 1985–86 FA Cup in the third round proper and lost in that round, at home to non-league club Altrincham, a result that prompted the resignation of Ron Saunders as manager. They were eliminated from the League Cup by Southampton in a third-round replay. John Bond succeeded Saunders as manager.

The top scorer was Andy Kennedy with just nine goals, of which seven were scored in league competition.

With the team already in the relegation positions, chairman Keith Coombs resigned in December 1985, selling his 70% shareholding to the former chairman of Walsall F.C., Ken Wheldon, who took over as chairman. The club's serious financial situation, not helped by low attendances, led to the departure of several senior administrative staff.

Football League First Division

League table (part)

FA Cup

League Cup

Appearances and goals

Numbers in parentheses denote appearances as substitute.
Players with name struck through and marked  left the club during the playing season.
Players with names in italics and marked * were on loan from another club for the whole of their season with Birmingham.

See also
Birmingham City F.C. seasons

References
General
 
 
 Source for match dates, league positions and results: 
 Source for lineups, appearances, goalscorers and attendances: Matthews (2010), Complete Record, pp. 406–07.

Specific

Birmingham City F.C. seasons
Birmingham City